Jama Zehi Kuh Dim (also Romanized as Jamā Zehī Kūh Dīm; also known as Faqīr Moḩammad Bāzār) is a village in Polan Rural District, Polan District, Chabahar County, Sistan and Baluchestan Province, Iran. At the 2006 census, its population was 239, in 39 families.

References 

Populated places in Chabahar County